"Bum steer", a term denoting misdirection, is predominantly from Australia, New Zealand and North America. The idiom means to provide information, intentionally or unintentionally,  that is incorrect, was unhelpful, or caused one to be led astray.  The idiom, as used in Australia and New Zealand, reached the United States in the 1920s probably after exposure to Australian troops on the Western Front during World War I, and is recorded in the UK since 1944.

Its origin is possibly from 19th-century American maritime humour and the difficulty of trying to steer a vessel in reverse.  A ship's stern is flat and lacks the pointed structure of a bow, and a ship is therefore difficult to maneuver in reverse when using the rudder, also found on the stern. The reverse maneuvering was accomplished therefore through shouted instructions from the wharf to the wheelhouse, via intermediary deckhands.  Such communication  was prone to misunderstanding owing to the wide variety of nationalities employed on United States merchant vessels during the 19th century.

Citations and notes

References
 Smith, Chrysti M., Verbivore's Feast: A Banquet of Word & Phrase Origins, Farcountry Press, 2003
 Kirkpatrick, E. M., Schwarz, C. M., The Wordsworth Dictionary of Idioms, Wordsworth Editions, 1993
 Fergusson, Rosalind, Partridge, Eric, Beale, Paul, Shorter Slang Dictionary: From the Work of Eric Partridge and Paul Beale, Routledge, 1994
 Kitching, G. N., Wittgenstein and Society: Essays in Conceptual Puzzlement, Ashgate Publishing, Ltd., 2003
 Urdang, Laurence, The Oxford Thesaurus: An A-Z Dictionary of Synonyms, Clarendon Press, 1991
 Barnhart, Robert K., Steinmetz, Sol, The Barnhart Dictionary of Etymology, H.W. Wilson Co., 1988
 Day, Thomas Fleming, Rudder, Fawcett Publications, 1958 
 The Chambers Dictionary, Edinburgh, Allied Publishers, 2007

Australian English
English-language idioms
Information